Matthew Tkachuk (born December 11, 1997) is an Canadian–American professional ice hockey winger and alternate captain for the Florida Panthers of the National Hockey League (NHL). Tkachuk was selected sixth overall at the 2016 NHL Entry Draft by the Calgary Flames.

Playing career
Tkachuk played in the 2010 Quebec International Pee-Wee Hockey Tournament with the St. Louis Blues minor ice hockey team, where he was teammates with Logan Brown, Clayton Keller and Luke Kunin.

Major junior

On May 8, 2015, Tkachuk gave up his NCAA eligibility when he signed with the London Knights of the Ontario Hockey League (OHL), who had drafted him in the fourth round of the 2013 OHL Priority Selection. Playing on a line with Mitch Marner and Christian Dvorak, Tkachuk scored 107 points, placing him fifth in OHL scoring. Tkachuk scored the game winning goal in overtime for the Knights in the 2016 Memorial Cup final.

Leading up to the NHL draft, Tkachuk was the second-ranked North American skater, described as a bona fide future star for an NHL club that brings elite skills and attributes. After his selection by the Calgary Flames, sixth overall, Tkachuk was signed to a three-year, entry-level contract on July 7, 2016.

NHL

Calgary Flames (2016–2022)
Tkachuk scored his first NHL goal in a 4–3 overtime win against the Buffalo Sabres. On March 20, 2017, he was suspended two games for an elbow to the face of Los Angeles Kings defenseman Drew Doughty. During the next meeting between the two teams on March 29, Tkachuk further settled the hit by fighting Kings defenseman Brayden McNabb. Tkachuk finished seventh in voting for the Calder Memorial Trophy, an award awarded annually to the top rookie in the NHL.

During his sophomore year, on November 17, 2017, the NHL Department of Player Safety announced that Tkachuk was suspended one game for his part in a line brawl that took place in a game against the Detroit Red Wings on November 15. He was suspended again on December 7, for spearing Toronto Maple Leafs winger Matt Martin. Tkachuk became the second youngest teenager in Flames history to reach 100 games, the first being Dan Quinn in 1985, when he played against the Arizona Coyotes on November 30. Tkachuk was injured in a game against the New York Islanders on March 11, 2018, and missed the rest of the season. Despite the injury, he finished the season with a career-high 49 points.

Prior to the 2018–19 season, Tkachuk was named an alternate captain for the Flames, along with Mikael Backlund and Sean Monahan. Tkachuk set a new career high for points during the season and recorded his first career NHL hat-trick in a 6–3 win over the Vegas Golden Knights. On March 15, 2019, Tkachuk recorded his 100th career assist and became the first player from his draft class to reach that milestone. 

After being absent from the Flames' training camp due to an unsigned contract, Tkachuk signed a three-year, $21 million extension on September 25, 2019.

On April 19, 2022, Tkachuk recorded his 99th point (an assist) in a 3–2 shootout loss to the Nashville Predators, surpassing his father's previous personal record (98 in 1995–96). Two days later, Tkachuk scored his 100th point (and 40 goals) in a 4–2 win against the Dallas Stars, becoming the second player, along with Auston Matthews from the 2016 draft class to score 100 points in a single season. The 2021–22 season was one of the most successful regular seasons in Flames history, with Tkachuk at the center of its success. With centreman Elias Lindholm and right winger Johnny Gaudreau, he formed one of the most dominant forward lines in the NHL, and all three members hit numerous personal and collective milestones over the course of the season. All three scored at least 40 goals in the course of the season, the first time in 28 years that linemates had all achieved this, and only the fourth time in that span that a team had three 40-goal scorers. Tkachuk finished the regular season with 42 goals and 62 assists, while the Flames won the Pacific Division title. The Flames drew the Dallas Stars in the first round of the 2022 Stanley Cup playoffs, a rematch of the bubble playoffs two years prior, and a matchup in which the Flames were considered the favourites. Tkachuk scored the lone goal of Game 1, giving his team the victory. The series proved a greater challenge than anticipated, largely due to Stars goaltender Jake Oettinger, but the Flames eventually won in seven games, with Tkachuk managing another goal in the series-clinching game. The Flames drew the Edmonton Oilers in the second round, the first playoff "Battle of Alberta" in 31 years. The Flames were defeated by the Oilers in five games, bringing the playoff run to an end.

After the conclusion of the season, teammate Gaudreau opted to leave the Flames in free agency to sign with the Columbus Blue Jackets. Tkachuk's own future with the team had been subject to speculation for some time, with many believing he intended to leave the Flames when he reached unrestricted free agency. Days after news of Gaudreau's departure, the Flames announced that they had filed for club arbitration on Tkachuk's next contract, having heretofore failed to come to terms on an extension. This was widely interpreted as being a preliminary measure in a move to trade him to another team, and thereby avoid losing Tkachuk in free agency for no compensation. On July 20, The Athletic reported that Tkachuk had told the Flames that he would not re-sign with the team for a long-term contract.

Florida Panthers (2022–present)
On July 22, 2022, two days after informing the Flames of his intention not to re-sign to a long-term deal, Tkachuk was traded to the Florida Panthers along with a conditional fourth-round draft pick in 2025 in exchange for Jonathan Huberdeau, MacKenzie Weegar, Cole Schwindt, and a lottery-protected first-round pick in 2025. Tkachuk signed an eight-year, $76 million contract prior to being traded to the Panthers. In the NHL 2023 All-Star Game on February 4, 2023, Tkachuk was named the Game MVP after scoring 4 goals and 3 assists of 7 points.

International play

Tkachuk helped the United States win gold at the 2014 World U-17 Hockey Challenge held in Nova Scotia. He also competed at the 2015 IIHF World U18 Championships, where in seven games he registered ten assists (tops in the tournament), leading the U.S. under-18 team to a gold medal win.

At the 2016 World Junior Ice Hockey Championships, held in Helsinki, Tkachuk and Auston Matthews each scored 11 points to lead the American team in scoring. After losing in the semi-finals, the U.S. defeated Sweden to claim the bronze medal.

Personal life
His father, Keith Tkachuk, played 1,201 games in the NHL and is a member of the United States Hockey Hall of Fame. Matthew Tkachuk's younger brother, Brady, plays for the Ottawa Senators and won bronze with the United States at the 2018 World Junior Ice Hockey Championships. Tkachuk was born in the Phoenix suburb of Scottsdale during his father's stint with the Coyotes, and grew up in the St. Louis suburb of Chesterfield, when his father was dealt to the St. Louis Blues in 2001. He attended Chaminade College Preparatory School from sixth to ninth grade until he decided to join the United States Hockey League. While at Chaminade, Tkachuk was in the same gym class and good friends with Boston Celtics forward Jayson Tatum.

Tkachuk is a second cousin of former NHL player Tom Fitzgerald, who grew up with his father and a second cousin once-removed to his sons, Ryan and Casey, who are both NHL prospects. He is also a cousin of NHL players Kevin and the late Jimmy Hayes. Tkachuk is a Ukrainian surname, although his father has said that his family background and name is either "Polish, Russian, [or] Ukrainian, one of those." Tkachuk is a dual citizen of the United States and Canada, as his mother Chantal is a native of Winnipeg.

Career statistics

Regular season and playoffs

International

Awards and honors

References

External links
 

1997 births
Living people
American expatriate ice hockey players in Canada
American men's ice hockey left wingers
American sportspeople of Canadian descent
American people of Ukrainian descent
Calgary Flames draft picks
Calgary Flames players
Chaminade College Preparatory School (Missouri) alumni
Florida Panthers players
Ice hockey people from Scottsdale, Arizona
Ice hockey people from St. Louis
London Knights players
National Hockey League first-round draft picks
USA Hockey National Team Development Program players